Rajeev Bala Krishnan (born 31 March 1971) is an Indian sprinter. He competed in the men's 4 × 100 metres relay at the 2000 Summer Olympics.

Personal bests
100 metres - 10.40 (+2.0 m/s, Bengaluru, 5 July 2000)

200 metres - 21.44 (+1.6 m/s, Long Beach CA, 10 June 2000)

References

External links
 

1971 births
Living people
Athletes (track and field) at the 2000 Summer Olympics
Indian male sprinters
Olympic athletes of India
Place of birth missing (living people)